Attorney General Clarke may refer to:

Cecil Clarke (born 1968), Attorney General of Nova Scotia
Ellis Clarke (1917–2010), Attorney General of Trinidad and Tobago
Fielding Clarke (1851–1928), Attorney General of Fiji

See also
Attorney General Clark (disambiguation)
General Clarke (disambiguation)